Zanbalan (also Romanized as Zanbalān and Zonbalan) is a village in Keyvan Rural District of the Central District of Khoda Afarin County, East Azerbaijan province, Iran. At the 2006 National Census, its population was 372 in 80 households, when it was in Khoda Afarin District of Kaleybar County. The following census in 2011 counted 352 people in 97 households, by which time Khoda Afarin County had been established. The latest census in 2016 showed a population of 330 people in 107 households; it was the largest village in its rural district.

References 

Khoda Afarin County

Populated places in East Azerbaijan Province

Populated places in Khoda Afarin County